The People's Republic of China (PRC) first competed at the Chess Olympiads in 1978 in Buenos Aires, Argentina. The women's team began competing in 1980. "Men's" teams in the Olympiads can include female players. Both teams have competed ever since.

Men's team records

Overall statistics

Yearly statistics

Overall Team vs Team statistics

Individual statistics 
By alphabetical order.

Women's team records

Overall statistics

Yearly statistics

Overall Team vs Team statistics

Individual statistics 
By alphabetical order.

See also
Chess in China

Sources
OlimpBase